The name Marcia has been used for four tropical cyclones in the Southern Hemisphere.
 Tropical Cyclone Marcia (1974), did not affect land
 Tropical Cyclone Marcia (1989), did not affect land
 Tropical Cyclone Marcia (2000), did not affect land
 Cyclone Marcia, one of the most intense tropical cyclones making landfall over Queensland, Australia

Australian region cyclone set index articles